Randall Hyde (born 1956) is best known as the author of The Art of Assembly Language, a popular book on assembly language programming. He created the Lisa assembler in the late 1970s and developed the High Level Assembly (HLA) language.

Biography
Hyde was educated, and later became a lecturer, at the University of California, Riverside.  He earned a bachelor's degree in Computer Science in 1982, and a master's degree in Computer Science in 1987 - both from UC Riverside. His area of specialization is compilers and other system software, and he has written compilers, assemblers, operating systems and control software.  He was a lecturer at California State Polytechnic University, Pomona from 1988 to 1993 and a lecturer at UC Riverside from 1989 to 2000.  While teaching at UC Riverside and Cal Poly, Pomona, Randy frequently taught classes pertaining to assembly programming (beginning and advanced), software design, compilers, and programming language theory.

He was founder and president of Lazer Microsystems, which wrote the SmartBASIC interpreter and ADAM Calc for the Coleco Adam.  According to Rich Drushel, the company also wrote the ADAM implementation of CP/M 2.2. He also wrote the 1983 Atari 2600 game Porky's while at Lazer, published by Fox Video Games.

Hyde has made many posts to the alt.lang.asm newsgroup in the past.

, Hyde operates and is president of Plantation Productions, Inc., a Riverside, California corporation providing sound, lighting, staging, and event support services for small to medium-sized venues, for audiences of 10 to 5,000 people.

Books

Modern books

Early Apple programming books
 How to Program the Apple II Using 6502 Assembly Language (1981)
 p-Source (A Guide to the Apple Pascal System) (1983)

References

External links
 Webster: The Place on the Net to Learn Assembly Language
 Randall Hyde's homepage
The Rebirth of Assembly Language Programming by Dan Romanchik, Application Development Trends, October 13, 2003, an interview with Randy Hyde about assembly language
The Fallacy of Premature Optimization, ACM Ubiquity, 2006, Volume 7, Issue 24.

University of California, Riverside alumni
Living people
Computer programmers
American technology writers
1956 births